General elections were held in San Marino on 11 March 1945. The British Army had required a fresh election for the final elimination of all fascist-friendly politicians. The result was a victory for the Committee of Freedom, which won 40 of the 60 seats in the Grand and General Council.

Electoral system
Voters had to be citizens of San Marino, male and at least 24 years old.

Results

References

San Marino
General elections in San Marino
Genera;
San Marino